Precious Patrick McKenzie  (born 6 June 1936) is a South African-born former weightlifter who won Commonwealth titles representing both England and New Zealand and has won several World powerlifting and Masters World powerlifting titles. He is of diminutive stature at 1.45m (4' 9").

Career
Born in Durban, South Africa, Precious McKenzie suffered from ill-health during his childhood. An ambition to be a circus performer ended because of South Africa's race laws and this led him to weight training and weightlifting. Although he was ranked the best weightlifter in his weight category in South Africa, he was barred from representing his country at the 1958 British Empire and Commonwealth Games that year.  Because he was classified as "Coloured" under the apartheid regime he was also excluded from the South African team for the 1960 Rome Olympiad. In 1963, he was told he could be included in the South African team for the 1964 Olympics, provided he was segregated from the white members of the team.  He refused and left South Africa for Britain in 1964 with his wife and young family.  British minister for sport, Denis Howell, fast-tracked his citizenship application to allow him to compete for England in the 1966 Commonwealth Games in Jamaica where he won gold.

Initially working as a clicker in a Northampton shoe factory, he moved to Bristol where he completed a Physical Education degree.

McKenzie competed in three Empire and Commonwealth Games representing England and at three Olympics (1968, 1972 and 1976) representing Britain. As a result of contacts made during the 1974 Commonwealth Games in Christchurch, New Zealand, he decided to settle in that country, where he was offered the opportunity to be a weight trainer in a gym. He settled in the North Island city of Auckland and won his fourth Commonwealth gold representing New Zealand at the age of 42 at the 1978 Commonwealth Games in Edmonton. He has won more Commonwealth and world medals in his sport than any other person, competing in both the bantam and flyweight divisions. 

McKenzie has one of the longest-held world records in sports, (possibly the longest-held current record): 37 years. His 607kg (1,339 lb) total in the 123 lb class, was achieved in 1979.

He subsequently became a private consultant in the field of back injury prevention and the New Zealand Safety Council's Manual Handling Advisor, running courses in New Zealand, Australia, Singapore, the United Kingdom and United States.

In 2006 he was recognised by his native country with an induction into the South African Sports Hall of Fame.

In 2008, a film was planned about his life. A New Zealand-based father-son team had a screenplay and sought funding in Cannes. They hoped to start shooting in South Africa by early November 2008. The relationship between McKenzie and the film makers deteriorated and ended in 2012 when McKenzie became disappointed with the slow pace of progress.

Documentary film 

McKenzie was one of nine athletes featured in a National Film Board of Canada documentary on the Edmonton Commonwealth Games, Going the Distance (1979).

References

External links
Biography at his website archived from the original on 20 January 2018

1936 births
Living people
Sportspeople from Durban
New Zealand male weightlifters
Members of the Order of the British Empire
South African emigrants to New Zealand
Weightlifters at the 1966 British Empire and Commonwealth Games
Weightlifters at the 1970 British Commonwealth Games
Weightlifters at the 1974 British Commonwealth Games
Weightlifters at the 1978 Commonwealth Games
Commonwealth Games gold medallists for England
Commonwealth Games gold medallists for New Zealand
Olympic weightlifters of Great Britain
Weightlifters at the 1968 Summer Olympics
Weightlifters at the 1972 Summer Olympics
Weightlifters at the 1976 Summer Olympics
Coloured South African people
Commonwealth Games medallists in weightlifting
Medallists at the 1966 British Empire and Commonwealth Games
Medallists at the 1970 British Commonwealth Games
Medallists at the 1974 British Commonwealth Games
Medallists at the 1978 Commonwealth Games